Hargrove is a surname which may refer to:

People
Anthony Hargrove (born 1983), American football player
Brian Hargrove (born 1956), American television writer and producer
Buzz Hargrove (born 1944), president of the Canadian Auto Workers trade union
Dean Hargrove (born 1938), American television producer, writer, and director
Dennis Hargrove Cooke (1904–1982), fourth president of what is now East Carolina University
Ed Hargrove, American football player and coach
Frank Hargrove (born 1927), American politician
Greg Hargrove (born 1959), Canadian politician
Jim Hargrove, Washington state senator
James Hargrove Meredith (1914–1988), United States federal judge
Jimmy Hargrove, American football player
John R. Hargrove, Sr. (born 1923), first African American to be appointed assistant United States Attorney for the District of Maryland
John R. Hargrove (attorney), chair of the board of trustees at Butler University
Linda Hargrove (born 1949), American country songwriter and musician
Marion Hargrove (1919–2003), American writer, author of See Here, Private Hargrove
Mark Hargrove (born 1956), American politician
Mike Hargrove (born 1949), baseball player and manager
Monica Hargrove (born 1982), American 200 and 400 metres runner
Neal Hargrove, American wrestler
Robert Kennon Hargrove (1829–1905), American bishop of the Methodist Episcopal Church
Roy Hargrove (born 1969), American jazz trumpeter

Fictional characters
Davinia Hargrove, from the BBC soap opera Doctors
the title character of the military comedy films See Here, Private Hargrove and What Next, Corporal Hargrove?, based on the Marion Hargrove memoir

See also
Theosophical Society in America (Hargrove), organization that developed from the Theosophical Society in America

English-language surnames